Steve Danny Marc De Ridder (born 25 February 1987) is a Belgian footballer who plays as a winger for Deinze on loan from Sint-Truiden.

He has played in the Netherlands for De Graafschap and FC Utrecht and in England for Southampton and Bolton Wanderers. He was born in Ghent.

Club career

De Graafschap
He was awarded the player of the season award for the 2010–11 season.

Southampton
On 22 July 2011, he joined Southampton from De Graafschap for a significant undisclosed fee on a three-year deal. He made his league debut coming on as a second-half substitute, replacing David Connolly against Leeds United on 6 August 2011. On 9 August 2011, he made his full debut in the League Cup first round, scoring the first goal in a 4–1 victory over Torquay United. On 28 September 2011, he scored his first league goal in a 2–1 loss to Cardiff City. On 22 October 2011, he scored a late equaliser in a 1–1 draw at Reading after coming on as a substitute.

He left the club on 1 August 2013, having his contract cancelled by mutual consent.

Bolton Wanderers loan
On 31 January 2013, De Ridder joined Bolton Wanderers on an initial one-month loan deal. He made his debut two days later, coming on as a second-half substitute for Chris Eagles, in Bolton's 2–1 defeat at Watford. On 4 March 2013, his loan spell ended and he returned to his parent club.

FC Utrecht
On 1 August 2013, De Ridder signed a three-year contract with FC Utrecht.

FC Copenhagen
In May 2014 De Ridder made a move to F.C. Copenhagen. He made his Danish Superliga debut on 20 July in a match against Silkeborg IF.

His contract was terminated at 19 August 2016.

Sint-Truiden
On 27 August 2019 he signed with Sint-Truiden. On 7 September 2022, De Ridder was loaned by Deinze.

Honours
De Graafschap
 Eerste Divisie: 2009–10

Southampton
Football League Championship runners-up: 2011–12

Copenhagen
 Danish Cup: 2014–15

References

External links
 
 Voetbal International profile 
 
 

1987 births
Footballers from Ghent
Living people
Belgian footballers
Belgium youth international footballers
Association football wingers
K.A.A. Gent players
S.C. Eendracht Aalst players
De Graafschap players
Southampton F.C. players
Bolton Wanderers F.C. players
FC Utrecht players
F.C. Copenhagen players
S.V. Zulte Waregem players
K.S.C. Lokeren Oost-Vlaanderen players
Sint-Truidense V.V. players
K.M.S.K. Deinze players
Belgian Pro League players
Challenger Pro League players
Eredivisie players
Eerste Divisie players
English Football League players
Premier League players
Danish Superliga players
Belgian expatriate footballers
Expatriate footballers in the Netherlands
Belgian expatriate sportspeople in the Netherlands
Expatriate footballers in England
Belgian expatriate sportspeople in England
Expatriate men's footballers in Denmark
Belgian expatriate sportspeople in Denmark